The 1881–82 season was the ninth Scottish football season in which Dumbarton competed at a national level.

Scottish Cup

Dumbarton reached the final of the Scottish Cup for the second consecutive season.  During the early years of the Cup, lodging a protest to a cup result was common place, and this season Dumbarton required to defeat both Hibernian and Rangers twice following successful protests.  The final opponents again were Glasgow giants Queen's Park; however, after a 2–2 draw in the first game, Dumbarton succumbed 1–4 in the replay.

Glasgow Charity Cup

Dumbarton once again took part in the Glasgow Charity Cup during the season and after a fine replay victory over Rangers in the semi final, came up against their old local rivals Vale of Leven in the final. The game finished in a 2–2 draw, after which there was to be a half hour's extra time.  Vale of Leven did not reappear, and the referee ordered Dumbarton to kick off, which they did and duly scored.  However the Charity committee decided that a replay should be played, and despite having the majority of the game the 'Vale' won by a single goal.

Friendlies

During the season 15 'friendly' matches were played, including home and away fixtures against Vale of Leven, 3rd LRV and St Bernards (including a game to celebrate the opening of St Bernards new stadium at Powderhall), an 11–1 thrashing of Lanarkshire Cup holders, Thistle and three games against north of England opposition. In all, 10 were won, 2 drawn and 3 lost, scoring 61 goals and conceding 19.

Player statistics

Of note amongst those donning the club colours for the first time was Leitch Keir.
Leaving the club, after a playing career spanning over six seasons which included an international cap for Scotland, was Archie Lang.

Only includes appearances and goals in competitive Scottish Cup matches.

Source:

International caps

An international trial match was played on 4 March 1882 to consider selection of teams to represent Scotland in the upcoming games against England and Wales. Jock Hutcheson, Joe Lindsay, James McAulay and Peter Miller all took part.

As a result, Dumbarton's James McAulay and Peter Miller earned their first caps playing for Scotland against Wales and England respectively.  McAulay scored a goal in the 5–0 win over the Welsh.

Representative match
Jock Hutcheson and James McAulay played in the Scotch Counties team which played Birmingham & District on 25 February 1882.  The 'Scotch' men lost 1–3.

Reserve team
As association football developed in Scotland, it was quite common when '1st XIs' played a fixture, a corresponding 'reserve' match would be played at the same time on the opposing side's ground.  However it was not until 1882 that the first competition at national level for reserve sides made its debut – the Scottish Second XI Cup.  Dumbarton went on to win the inaugural contest, beating Vale of Leven 3–0 in the final – the club's first national success.

References

Dumbarton F.C. seasons
Scottish football clubs 1881–82 season